Race to Freedom: Uhm Bok-dong is a 2019 South Korean biographical drama film directed and written by Kim Yoo-sung. It stars Rain as a legendary cyclist Uhm Bok-dong.

This film was a critical and commercial failure, and is considered to be one of the worst South Korean films ever made.

Plot
Based on the true story of famed cyclist Uhm Bok-dong, who became a symbol of pride for Koreans when he defeated Japanese cyclists and won the championship in a bicycle race which took place during the Japanese colonial rule of Korea.

Cast
 Rain as Uhm Bok-dong
 Kang So-ra as Kim Hyung-shin
 Lee Beom-soo as Hwang Jae-ho
 Min Hyo-rin as Kyeong-ja
 Shin Cheol-jin as Oil Shop Owner	
 Jo Seo-hoo as Miki
 Oh Min-ae as Sang-goong
 Park Jin-joo
 Ko Chang-seok
 Lee Geung-young
 Lee Si-eon
 Lee Won-jong as Choi Jae-pil
 Hwang Hee as Long sword provost officer

Production 
Principal photography began on April 18, 2017, and wrapped on September 29, 2017.

Reception
The film was considered widely among Korean audiences as a massive flop, and a meme about the film having attracted the lowest audiences in South Korean film has given birth to a meme that uses the number of people who watched the film, which was about 170,000, as a unit called 'UBD".

Controversy
The film got into a controversy because of Um's past as a robber.

References

External links
 
 

2019 films
2019 biographical drama films
South Korean biographical drama films
Films set in Korea under Japanese rule
2019 drama films
South Korean films based on actual events
2010s South Korean films